Adenomera diptyx is a species of frog in the family Leptodactylidae. It is native to northern Argentina, Paraguay, eastern Bolivia, and southern Brazil. It was resurrected from the synonymy of Adenomera hylaedactyla in 1996.

Adenomera diptyx is a common species. It is sometimes even seen in gardens. It also occurs in protected areas and is not considered to be a threatened species.

References

Diptyx
Amphibians of Argentina
Amphibians of Bolivia
Amphibians of Brazil
Amphibians of Paraguay
Amphibians described in 1885
Taxa named by Oskar Boettger
Taxonomy articles created by Polbot